Gods and Generals  is the second studio album by Swedish power metal band Civil War, released in 2015.

Track listing

Personnel 
Nils Patrik Johansson – vocals
Rikard Sundén – guitar
Petrus Granar – guitar
Daniel Mÿhr – keyboards
Daniel Mullback – drums

Charts

References 

2015 albums
Civil War (band) albums